Abraham ibn Zimra (French: Abraham Benzamiro) was a Spanish rabbi, physician and diplomat who fled to Morocco following the Spanish Inquisition.
 
Descended from a well-known and respected Sephardi family, ibn Zimra settled in Safi, Morocco following the expulsion from Spain in 1492. He was a talented calligrapher and composed poetry in Hebrew and Arabic.

He is buried in Safi with his six siblings and his tomb is the site of an annual pilgrimage.

References 

16th-century Moroccan rabbis
Moroccan people of Spanish-Jewish descent
Spanish rabbis
Jews expelled from Spain in 1492
Year of birth unknown
Year of death unknown
People from Safi, Morocco
15th-century Spanish Jews
15th-century Moroccan people
15th-century rabbis
Medieval Moroccan rabbis
15th-century Sephardi Jews